The New Zealand version of the NWA Austra-Asian Tag Team Championship was a professional wrestling tag team championship defended in the National Wrestling Alliance-affiliated All Star Pro Wrestling from 1981 to 1984. The titles were awarded to Steve Rickard and Mark Lewin on October 8, 1981, and were last held by Mark and Chris Youngblood in late-1984 before the titles were retired. There were 7 officially recognized teams and 16 individual champions in the titles 3-year history.

Title history

Reigns

References

National Wrestling Alliance championships
Tag team wrestling championships
Intercontinental professional wrestling championships